Zetela is a genus of sea snails, marine gastropod mollusks in the family Solariellidae.

Species

Species within the genus Zetela include:
 Zetela alphonsi Vilvens, 2002
 Zetela annectens Marshall, 1999
 † Zetela awamoana Laws, 1939 
 † Zetela castigata (Marwick, 1931) 
 Zetela kopua Marshall, 1999
 † Zetela praetextilis (Suter, 1917)
 Zetela semisculpta (E. von Martens, 1904)
 Zetela tabakotanii(Poppe, Tagaro & Dekker, 2006)
 Zetela tangaroa Marshall, 1999
 Zetela textilis (Murdoch & Suter, 1906)
 Zetela variabilis Dell, 1956
Species brought into synonymy
 Zetela dedonderorum Poppe, Tagaro & Dekker, 2006: synonym of Solariella dedonderorum (Poppe, Tagaro & Dekker, 2006)

References

 
Solariellidae
Gastropod genera